Clypeola may refer to:
 Clypeola (gastropod), a sea snail genus in the family Calyptraeidae
 Clypeola (plant), a plant genus in the family Brassicaceae